Haku may refer to:

People 
Haku (surname)
Haku (wrestler) (Tonga Fifita, born 1959), Tongan professional wrestler

Characters 
Haku (Naruto), a character in Naruto media
Haku, a character in the 2001 animated movie Spirited Away

Places 
Haku, Iran
Mount Haku, Japan
Haku, Bagmati, Nepal
Haku, Karnali,  Nepal

Adornment 
Lei (garland), garland worn on the head

Animals 
Seriola lalandi, in the Māori language